Badpash District is located in Laghman Province of Afghanistan.

References 

Districts of Laghman Province